Gridiron Gang is a 2006 American sports drama film directed by Phil Joanou, and starring Dwayne Johnson, Xzibit, L. Scott Caldwell and Kevin Dunn. It is loosely based on the true story of the Kilpatrick Mustangs during the 1990 season. The film was released in the United States on September 15, 2006. It was distributed by Sony Pictures Releasing and Columbia Pictures.

Plot
Sean Porter (Dwayne Johnson) works at Kilpatrick Detention Center in Los Angeles. He becomes frustrated at not being able to help the kids get away from their problems in life when they are released from the center, such as street gangs and drug dealings.  He decides to create a football team so the kids can feel like they're part of something. Porter believes that football will teach the teenage inmates what it takes to be responsible, mature, and disciplined winners.

He picks out a few kids in the room that he feels will benefit from this program and requires that they practice with him the following day. He states to his new team, the Kilpatrick Mustangs, "You do it my way, not your way.  Your way got you here and you're here because you lost.  Right now you are all losers, but if you accept this challenge and stick with the program, you are all going to be winners at the end."

Two of the teens do not get along because they are from rival gangs. William "Willie" Weathers (Jade Yorker) is from the 88's and Kelvin Owens (David Thomas) is from the 95's (also why you will notice Willie wears the number 13 and Kelvin wears the number 31). The first game is against one of the best teams in the league, Barrington Panthers. The game starts out somewhat positive for the Mustangs, as they recover a fumble on the first drive, but things quickly turn. They are demolished by Barrington, losing by 38 points.

After starting 0–2, the Mustangs start winning games as they learn to work together. Kelvin and Willie finally shake hands when they win a game by one touchdown after Kelvin makes a big block for Willie. Near the end of the season, the Mustangs are headed for the playoffs. They are getting more publicity and more fans along the way.

One of Willie's 88 gang mates, Free, stops by the field. He realizes that Kelvin is a 95. Free and Kelvin get into a fight, and Free shoots Kelvin in the shoulder. As Free prepares to put another bullet in Kelvin's head, Willie runs toward Free and tackles him to the ground to save Kelvin. Free is shocked that Willie helped Kelvin and not him.

The police show up, and Free runs off. He fires at the responding officers who fire in return, killing him. Although Kelvin survives the attack, he will not be able to play in the finals. Kilpatrick is almost forced to forfeit the playoff game due to concerns about further gang violence, but Porter's boss steps in to prevent it by arranging for volunteers from neighboring police departments to patrol the game.  The County Sheriff's spokesperson states that "We will do whatever it takes to ensure that gangs do not take over the lives of our youth".

In the playoff game, a rematch against Barrington, the Mustangs go into the half down 14–0. Willie gives a motivational speech, and they go out and beat Barrington on the last play of the game. It is revealed in the narration that they lost the championship game 17–14, but no one called them losers. A few months later, Sean's football method is officially made part of the program.

Nearly all the former members of the Mustangs are doing well in their new lives outside the detention center: Willie Weathers is playing football at a top boarding school. Kelvin Owens is playing football for Washington High. Kenny Bates is going to school in Redondo Beach and living with his mother. Junior Palaita got a job working for a furniture company and Leon Hayes is playing football for Dorsey High. However, Miguel Perez and Donald Madlock went back to their old gangs and are now in California youth authority prisons, and Bug Wendal was killed in a drive-by shooting in Compton, California.

In all, 24 of the players are continuing their educations, three are working full-time jobs, and only five are back in jail. The movie ends with a new group of Mustangs training for the next season. Some footage of the 1993 Gridiron Gang documentary is shown during the end credits.

Cast

Production
It is set and filmed at Agoura Hills, Camp Kilpatrick, Los Angeles, San Fernando and Westlake Village, California, in 92 days between May 23 and August 23, 2005.

Reception
Rotten Tomatoes reports a 43% approval rating with an average rating of 5.65/10 based on 101 reviews. The website's consensus reads, "The role of probation officer Sean Porter fits Dwayne "The Rock" Johnson like a glove; however, the execution is so clichéd, the youths' stories (based on real events), fail to inspire."

Home media
DVD was released in Region 1 in the United States on January 16, 2007, and also Region 2 in the United Kingdom on 4 June 2007, it was distributed by Newvideo Home Entertainment.

See also
List of teachers portrayed in films
List of hood films

References

External links

 
 
 
 Visual Arts Ent. Official site 
 Gridiron Gang on americanfootballfilms

2006 films
2006 crime drama films
American coming-of-age drama films
American crime drama films
American football films
Columbia Pictures films
Films set in California
Films set in Los Angeles
Hood films
Sports films based on actual events
Original Film films
Biographical films about educators
Biographical films about sportspeople
Cultural depictions of players of American football
2000s coming-of-age drama films
2000s English-language films
2000s American films